The 1976–77 Algerian Championnat National was the 15th season of the Algerian Championnat National since its establishment in 1962. A total of 16 teams contested the league, with MC Alger as the defending champions, The Championnat started on September 10, 1976. and ended on July 1, 1977.

Team summaries

Promotion and relegation 
Teams promoted from Algerian Division 2 1976-1977 
 ASM Oran
 DNC Alger
 CS Constantine

Teams relegated to Algerian Division 2 1977-1978
 MO Constantine
 RCG Oran
 ES Guelma

League table

References

External links
1976–77 Algerian Championnat National

Algerian Ligue Professionnelle 1 seasons
1976–77 in Algerian football
Algeria